Melissa Sweet is an Australian journalist and non-fiction writer. Formerly employed by The Sydney Morning Herald, The Bulletin magazine and Australian Associated Press, she specializes in writing about human health and medicine.

Early life and career

Sweet grew up in central Queensland, and on completing school, enrolled in a Bachelor of Arts degree with majors in journalism and agriculture at Western Australian Institute of Technology (WAIT, now Curtin University of Technology) in Perth. Sweet was awarded the WAIT Academic Staff Association Medal as top graduating student when she completed the course in 1984.

From 1987, she spent six years as medical writer for the press agency Australian Associated Press, then took a position with PR firm Hill and Knowlton from 1993 to 1994 as a Senior account manager (healthcare). She moved back into news journalism in 1994, working as the medical writer for the Sydney Morning Herald and a columnist for Good Weekend magazine until 1998, when she was employed by The Bulletin magazine as a columnist and feature writer until 2003.

In 2002, Sweet was invited to join the Advisory Committee to an Australian Law Reform Commission and Australian Health Ethics Committee joint inquiry into the protection of human genetic information.

Sweet was awarded the National Press Club John Douglas Pringle Award in 2003, involving a travelling fellowship to the UK to research quality and safety in health care in England.

Since then, she has been a freelance journalist, with a regular column in the Adelaide Independent Weekly until 2005, and adjunct senior lecturer positions at the University of Sydney and University of Notre Dame.

Sweet currently runs Croakey, a social journalism in health initiative, and contributes to Australian Rural Doctor, Australian Doctor, Australian Worker, the British Medical Journal, The Medical Journal of Australia, Australian Prescriber,  Australian Nursing Journal and other professional publications.

In 2008, Sweet was awarded the Obesity Society Media Award.

Sweet is one of the founders of YouComm News, an Australian open-source community journalism project which began in 2010.

On completion of her PhD, Sweet was awarded the Parker Medal for most outstanding thesis for 2017 at Canberra University.

Bibliography

 Smart health choices: how to make informed health decisions, (with Judy Irwig and Les Irwig) Allen & Unwin, St Leonards, 1999
 Inside madness: how one woman's passionate drive to reform the mental health system ended in tragedy, Pan Macmillan Australia, Sydney, 2006
 Improving population health: the uses of systematic reviews (with Ray Moynihan), Centers for Disease Control and Prevention, Atlanta, 2007
 The big fat conspiracy, ABC Books, Sydney, 2007
 Ten Questions You Must Ask Your Doctor (with Ray Moynihan), Allen & Unwin, Sydney, 2008

References

External links
 
 Melissa Sweet at LinkedIn
  
 Melissa Sweet at AUSTLIT
 Melissa Sweet at National Library of Australia (2015-04-09, not yet identified by NLA id number)

Living people
Australian freelance journalists
Griffith Review people
Medical journalists
Year of birth missing (living people)
The Sydney Morning Herald people